"Who's Lovin' You" is a Motown soul song, written in 1960 by William "Smokey" Robinson. The song has been recorded by many different artists including The Miracles, who recorded the 1960 original version, The Temptations, The Supremes, Terence Trent D'arby, Brenda and The Tabulations, John Farnham, Human Nature, En Vogue, Michael Bublé and Giorgia Todrani and Jessica Mauboy. The most famous version is attributed to The Jackson 5. Shaheen Jafargholi, then twelve years old, performed the song at Michael Jackson's public memorial service in July 2009.

The Miracles original version
The song was written by Smokey Robinson for his group The Miracles, who recorded the song in 1960 for their first Motown album, Hi... We're the Miracles. The song is a lamentation about an ex-lover, reminiscing on how their relationship went sour and wondering who's loving them now. A showcase for vocal runs, "Who's Lovin' You" was issued as a b-side to their first Motown hit, "Shop Around" (the label's first million-selling hit single), and remained one of their most popular songs (becoming a strong regional hit in many areas of the country). During the 1960s, virtually every major Motown act, from The Supremes to the Temptations to Brenda Holloway, recorded a remake of the song.

Brenda & the Tabulations version
Though today this version is relatively obscure compared to others like those of The Miracles and The Jackson 5, it is to date the only one to place on the Billboard Hot 100. Released in 1967 on Dionn 501, Brenda & the Tabulations took this song to position #66. It was also a #19 hit on Billboard's R&B chart. The gender of the lyrics was amended to fit the female vocalist.

Chart history

Jackson 5 version

The most famous cover of "Who's Lovin' You", and the one most future covers were based upon, was recorded on August 7, 1969 by the Jackson 5. Michael Jackson was the lead singer on this recording, with his brothers Marlon, Tito, Jermaine, and Jackie on background vocals; Bobby Taylor of the Vancouvers served as producer. The Jackson 5 version of "Who's Lovin' You" was one of a number of early recordings the group made at the Hitsville U.S.A. recording studio in Detroit, Michigan, with the Funk Brothers on instrumentation. Just after recording this song, Berry Gordy moved the entire Jackson family to Los Angeles, California to record the hit pop songs he would co-write for the group with the Corporation.

The song was issued as the b-side to the Jackson 5's first single, "I Want You Back", which went to #1 on both the pop and R&B charts.  A shortened version was included on the first Jackson 5 LP, Diana Ross Presents The Jackson 5.  The original single version was twenty seconds longer, with fewer backing vocals and sparser instrumentation than the album version.  The mono single mix was released on Michael's Love Songs compilation release in 2002.

The Jackson 5 performed this on their first Ed Sullivan Show appearance.

When the group performed the song during their concerts and live performances, Michael usually gave an intro about being really young but knowing about the blues, usually stating how he met the girl during sandbox and sharing cookies, and ended in "I stepped up to her and i said..." the song started from there. In their first concert in Philadelphia, it (along with "I Want You Back") caused the show to be stopped for several minutes because of such a huge response from the audience. It was a regularly performed/popular song in their set-list from 1970 to early 1972, presumably dropped from the set because of more hits being released and Michael's voice beginning to change in 1972.

The song was remixed by No ID for the 2009 release The Remix Suite.

Chart performance
On May 2, 2009, the song debuted at No. 54 in UK Official Singles Chart, and peaked at No.36 in July 2009.

Certifications

Lauryn Hill version
In 1988, 13-year-old Lauryn Hill appeared as an Amateur Night contestant on It's Showtime at the Apollo. Hill sang her own version of William "Smokey" Robinson's song "Who's Lovin' You?". As she began the song, the crowd began to boo at Hill. A nervous Hill sang with the microphone far away from her mouth and was heckled at first, but she persisted and finished her song to standing applause, though she did not win.

En Vogue version
En Vogue's cover of "Who's Lovin' You" was attached to the beginning of their first single, "Hold On" (1990), which was written as an answer song to Robinson's composition. The idea was born when, while the ladies were practicing the song in producer Denzil Foster's car, when he accidentally turned on a drum machine, creating an interesting juxtaposition of old school hip hop and new jack swing.

The opening section of "Hold On", released as the group's first single, was an a cappella version of the song's first verse. Once the ladies reach the line "and I wonder/who's lovin' you", a drum machine kicks in and starts a new jack swing beat, over which "Hold On" is delivered. "Hold On" was the anchor of En Vogue's first album, Born to Sing, which eventually went platinum.

Terence Trent D'Arby version
Terence Trent D'Arby ended his 1987 debut album Introducing the Hardline According to Terence Trent D'Arby with a cover of "Who's Lovin' You". The album earned D'Arby a Grammy award the following year.

Teodora Sava version
The song was performed live by Teodora Sava (15 years old at that time) in the auditions of X Factor Romania 2017. Her performance got a standing ovation from the judges and audience, and 4 Yes, making the judges say that they haven't heard such a rendition for years, and that she was a serious candidate for winning the song contest that year. Her performance triggered positive reactions online, with several hundred thousands views on YouTube.

Performing personnel

The Miracles version*
 Lead vocals by Smokey Robinson and Claudette Rogers Robinson (on fade).
 Background vocals by Claudette Rogers Robinson. Pete Moore, Ronnie White, and Bobby Rogers.
 Guitar by Marv Tarplin

The Supremes version*
 Lead vocals by Diana Ross
 Background vocals by Florence Ballard, Mary Wilson, and Barbara Martin

The Temptations version*
 Lead vocals by David Ruffin
 Background vocals by Eddie Kendricks, Melvin Franklin, Paul Williams, and Otis Williams

Brenda & the Tabulations version
 Lead vocals by Brenda Payton
 Background vocals by Eddie Jackson, Maurice Coates and Jerry Jones

The Jackson 5 version*
 Lead vocals by Michael Jackson
 Background vocals by Jermaine Jackson, Tito Jackson, Jackie Jackson, and Marlon Jackson
 Bass by James Jamerson

En Vogue version (intro to Hold On)
 Lead vocals by Terry Ellis
 Background vocals by Cindy Herron, Maxine Jones, and Dawn Robinson

A Tribute to Michael Jackson version*
 Lead vocals by Dawn Robinson
 Background vocals by Jermaine Jackson, Tito Jackson, Jackie Jackson, Marlon Jackson, and Randy Jackson

(*) Instrumentation on these versions performed by the Funk Brothers.

See also
 "Hold On" (En Vogue song)

References

1960 songs
1960 singles
1961 singles
1967 singles
1969 singles
The Miracles songs
Motown singles
The Supremes songs
The Jackson 5 songs
Terence Trent D'Arby songs
Songs written by Smokey Robinson
Song recordings produced by Berry Gordy
Song recordings produced by Smokey Robinson
Tamla Records singles
Jamie Records singles